

A-L
Amo
Amo THI & E Interurban Depot/Substation
Beverly Shores
Beverly Shores South Shore Railroad Station
Bloomington
Illinois Central Railroad Freight Depot
Carmel
Carmel Monon Depot
Chesterton
New York Central Railroad Passenger Depot
Converse
Converse Depot
Fort Wayne
Pennsylvania Railroad Station
Gary
Union Station
Griffith
Griffith Grand Trunk Depot
Hobart
Pennsylvania Railroad Station
Indianapolis
Indianapolis Union Station
Jeffersonville
Spring Street Freight House
Kokomo
Lake Erie and Western Depot Historic District
Lafayette
Big Four Depot
Linden
Linden Depot

M-Z
Martinsville 
Martinsville Vandalia Depot
Morristown
Junction Railroad Depot
Muncie
Cincinnati, Richmond, & Muncie Depot
New Haven
Craigville Depot
New York Chicago and St. Louis Railroad Steam Locomotive No. 765
Nickel Plate 765
Wabash Railroad Depot
Noblesville
Nickel Plate 587
Plainfield
THI and E Interurban Depot-Substation
Pleasant Lake
Pleasant Lake Depot
Richmond
Richmond Railroad Station Historic District
Scottsburg
Scottsburg Depot
Seymour
Southern Indiana Railroad Freighthouse
Union City
Union City Passenger Depot

 

Rail transportation in Indiana